Railroad Man may refer to:

Railroad Man's Magazine, a magazine published in 1906
The Railroad Man, a 1956 Italian film directed by Pietro Germi
Poppoya, a 1999 Japanese film directed by Yasuo Furuhata